Pterartoria is a genus of spiders in the family Lycosidae. It was first described in 1903 by Purcell. , it contains 5 species.

References

Lycosidae
Araneomorphae genera
Spiders of South Africa
Spiders of Indonesia